Mister Miracle is the name of three fictional superheroes appearing in American comic books published by DC Comics.

The Scott Free version of Mister Miracle first appeared in Mister Miracle #1 (April 1971) and was created by Jack Kirby.

Publication history
Mister Miracle debuted in the first issue of the eponymous series cover dated April 1971 as part of the Fourth World tetralogy. Big Barda, the character's love interest, was introduced in Mister Miracle #4 (October 1971). According to creator Jack Kirby's then-assistant Mark Evanier, Kirby wanted to be a comics creator and creative supervisor at DC Comics, rather than a regular writer-artist: "... we were going to turn Mr. Miracle over to Steve Ditko after a couple of issues and have me write it and Ditko draw it. Carmine Infantino, publisher of DC at the time, vetoed that and said Kirby had to do it all himself." Evanier did unofficially co-plot most issues of the series.

The original title featuring this character was the longest-lasting of the Fourth World titles, lasting 18 issues while the other titles, New Gods and The Forever People, were cancelled after only 11 issues. The most traditionally super-heroesque comic of the various Fourth World titles, the last seven issues as well as later incarnations of the series would downplay the Fourth World mythology in favor of more traditional superhero fare. The character teamed up with Batman three times in The Brave and the Bold. The title was revived in September 1977 by Steve Englehart and Marshall Rogers. Steve Gerber and Michael Golden produced three issues ending with #25 (September 1978) with several story lines unresolved. Mister Miracle teamed with Superman in DC Comics Presents #12 (August 1979) and met the Justice League of America and the Justice Society of America in Justice League of America #183–185 (October–December 1980).

When the character was revived as part of the Justice League International lineup in 1987, a one-shot special by writer Mark Evanier and artist Steve Rude was published in 1987. This special was followed by an ongoing series that began in January 1989, written by J. M. DeMatteis and drawn by Ian Gibson. Other writers who contributed to the title include Keith Giffen, Len Wein, and Doug Moench. This run lasted 28 issues before cancellation in 1991. The series was largely humor-driven, per Giffen's reimagining Scott Free, his wife Big Barda, and their friend Oberon, who pretended to be Scott's uncle, as living in suburbia when they were not fighting evil with the Justice League.

In 1996, a series written by Kevin Dooley showed Scott attempting to escape his destiny as a New God by working for a charitable foundation in New York. This ran for seven issues, before all Fourth World titles were canceled for the launch of Jack Kirby's Fourth World.

In addition, Scott's ally and wife Big Barda was made a member of the revived Justice League and appeared regularly in the Jack Kirby's Fourth World series by John Byrne.

With the launching of Grant Morrison's meta-series Seven Soldiers, Mister Miracle was revived as a four-issue miniseries. This miniseries focused instead on Scott's sidekick and apprentice Shilo Norman, who died.

In 2017, the character returned in a 12 issue limited series written by Tom King (Batman, The Omega Men: The End is Here, The Vision, The Sheriff of Babylon) and illustrated by Mitch Gerads (Batman, Sheriff of Babylon).

From July 2021 to January 2022, Mister Miracle: The Source of Freedom was published as a six issue miniseries starring Shilo Norman as Mister Miracle.  The series was written by Brandon Easton and drawn by Fico Ossio.

Fictional character biography
Mister Miracle was one of four DC Comics series in Kirby's ambitious, but short-lived, Fourth World saga. Mister Miracle, Super Escape Artist was inspired by comic book writer/artist Jim Steranko. Mister Miracle's relationship with his wife Big Barda is based on Kirby's relationship with his own wife Roz.

Thaddeus Brown
Thaddeus Brown was a circus escape artist whose stage name was Mister Miracle. As the first escape artist to use the name Mister Miracle, Brown earned a modest living and practiced his art into his later years. Brown met Scott Free as he was practicing an outdoor escape with his long-time friend and assistant Oberon. Scott then aided Brown as he was being coerced by Intergang thugs working for Intergang member Steel Hand by fighting them off. Unbeknownst to Scott, Intergang was actually an Earth crime organization run by Darkseid. Brown then told Scott that he was being harassed by the local Intergang Capo known as Steel Hand. Brown and Steel Hand had been in a hospital together and made a bet that Brown couldn't escape death. While practicing an escape of  being tied to a tree with a projectile speeding toward him, Brown was shot by a sniper working for Steel Hand while Scott and Oberon stood by helplessly. After Brown's murder, Scott put on Brown's costume and exacted his revenge on Steel Hand by bringing him down. Scott Free took up the Mister Miracle name and hired his assistant Oberon. Scott and Oberon, later joined by Big Barda, toured the country as the Mister Miracle Super Escape Artist show.

Thaddeus was later revealed to have a son named Ted.

In 2016, DC Comics implemented another relaunch of its books called "DC Rebirth" which restored its continuity to a form much as it was prior to "The New 52". Thaddeus was one of Batman's teachers, educating a young Bruce Wayne in the art of escape.

At the end of the "Flashpoint Beyond" limited series, Thaddeus Brown was among the Thirteen in the custody of the Time Masters. The capsules containing Thaddeus and those with him were found to have failed and they have been pulled back to the 1940s where history is rebuilding around them.

During "The New Golden Age", Thaddeus Brown' bio revealed that his history of being shot by a sniper working for Steel Hand remains intact. Though it is claimed that Ted and a few people might know that Thaddeus faked his death. Mister Miracle was revealed to have been part of a group called the Justice Society Dark. In 1941, Doctor Fate and Salem the Witch Girl come across Mister Miracle fighting Solomon Grundy while Zatara and Diamond Jack are having a spat. After Solomon Grundy was chained up, Mister Miracle suggests to Doctor Fate and Salem the Witch Girl that they should go apprehend Bride of Grundy.

Scott Free

Scott Free is the son of Izaya Highfather, the ruler of New Genesis, and his wife, Avia. As part of a diplomatic move to stop a destructive, techno-cosmic war against the planet Apokolips, Highfather agreed to an exchange of heirs with the galactic tyrant Darkseid. The exchange of heirs as hostages was supposed to guarantee that neither side would attack the other. Scott was traded for Darkseid's second-born son Orion.

Scott grew up in one of Granny Goodness' "Terror Orphanages" with no knowledge of his own heritage, but still refused to allow his spirit to break under the ever-present torturous training of the institution. As he matured, Scott rebelled against the totalitarian ideology of Apokolips. Hating himself for being unable to fit in despite his unfailing defiance of the abuse he suffered, Scott was influenced by Metron to see a future beyond Darkseid. Scott became part of a small band of pupils who were tutored in secret by the Apokolips Resistance leader Himon, a New Genesian living under cover as a Hunger Dog on Apokolips. It was at these meetings that Scott met Lieutenant  Big Barda of Darkseid's Female Furies who would later become his wife.

Eventually, Free escaped and fled to Earth. His escape, long anticipated and planned for by Darkseid, nullified the pact between Darkseid and Highfather; giving Darkseid the excuse he needed to revive the war with New Genesis. Once on Earth, Free met circus escape artist Thaddeus Brown, whose stage name was Mister Miracle. Brown was impressed with Scott's skills (especially as supplemented with various advanced devices he had taken from his previous home). Scott befriended Brown's assistant, a dwarf named Oberon. When Thaddeus Brown was murdered, Free assumed the identity of Mister Miracle. Barda later followed Scott to Earth and the two used their New Gods powers, equipment and skills in the war against Darkseid; who was still interested in recapturing both of them. Eventually, tired of being chased on Earth by Darkseid's servants, Scott returned to Apokolips and won his freedom by legal means, through trial by combat.

Scott later met Brown's son Ted.

Free later became a member of the Justice League International as did Barda and Oberon, which recast him and Big Barda as semi-retired super-heroes that sought to live quiet lives in the suburbs when they were not involved in Justice League-related adventures. In particular, Free was recast as a hen-pecked husband, who often found himself on the receiving end of his wife's temper over her desire to live a quiet life on Earth.

During his time in the League, Scott developed an intense rivalry with Justice League villain Manga Khan. The villainous intergalactic trader and black marketer repeatedly kidnapped Scott, ultimately convincing Scott's conniving former manager Funky Flashman into forging documents forcing Scott to work for Manga as his personal entertainer. To force him to go along willingly, Khan replaced Scott with a lifelike robot who was ultimately murdered by Despero during his first mission with the Justice League. Scott ultimately escaped from Manga Khan's clutches and reunited with his wife and friends, though the shock was enough to cause Scott to ultimately quit the League and to take on a protégé in the form of Shilo Norman.

In the conclusion of Final Crisis, many of the New Gods are all seemingly reborn. Among their numbers are the apparently resurrected Mister Miracle and Barda.

In September 2011, The New 52 rebooted DC's continuity. In this new timeline, Mister Miracle appears alongside Big Barda flying around the ruins of Gotham City on Earth 2. Their purpose is revealed to find the mysterious new Batman, which is thwarted when both are attacked by Fury.

Shilo Norman
Abandoned by his mother when he was only an infant, Shilo Norman's desire to escape was fostered in an abusive orphanage. 

He eventually ran away and ended up on the streets near the informal ward of escapologist Thaddeus Brown (the original Mister Miracle), and he served as an occasional stand-in. When Brown was murdered by Intergang mobster Steel Hand, Scott Free avenged his new friend's death by taking on the identity of Mister Miracle and brought Steel Hand to justice. After Brown's death, Shilo worked with Scott and his wife Barda. A master escape artist himself, the now-adult Shilo was appointed security chief of the Slabside Island Maximum Security prison for Metahumans known as the Slab. He held his own during the Joker's "Last Laugh" riot and was promoted to Warden of the Slab, which had by then been relocated to Antarctica. A somewhat reconceived Shilo Norman appears in Grant Morrison's Seven Soldiers crossover. In Final Crisis #2, Shilo tells Sonny Sumo "There was a cosmic war and the powers of evil won", prompting him to form a team to fight the evil gods. Shilo was later summoned by Nix Uotan to fight against Mandrakk the Dark Monitor.

Shilo would later appear as Mister Miracle alongside his other Seven Soldiers team mates in the Grant Morrison and Dan Didio written Sideways.

Shilo Norman's Mister Miracle also appears in Mister Miracle: The Source of Freedom, a six-issue miniseries spinning out of the events of DC Future State and tying into Infinite Frontier.

Powers and abilities
Like all the New Gods, Scott Free is functionally immortal; having stopped aging around the age of 30, he has developed an immunity to toxins and diseases. Scott has superhuman strength, agility, speed, coordination and reflexes, along with incredible stamina. Due to his exhausting and rigorous life on Apokolips, his body has tremendous resistance to the extreme temperatures, physical injury, psychic influence and he is capable of extremely rapid recovery.
 
Scott has a genius-level intellect and is knowledgeable about much of the universe. During his life on Apokolips, he was instructed by Himon in the science and use of advanced Fourth World's technology. He is a genius inventor who has designed most of the equipment in his costume, including his Mother Box.

Scott was trained by Granny Goodness as an Aero-trooper. Although he despises violence and is often portrayed as a pacifist, he is still an exceptional warrior, instructed in all combat techniques of Apokolips and very skilled with weapons. On one occasion, he was able to beat Big Barda. Also, he is a master escapologist and acrobat. He is considered better at escapes than Batman, and much of his skill is the result of his advanced physiology.

Scott Free is heir of the Alpha Effect, the antithesis of Darkseid's Omega Energy. This power was almost unlimited and allowed him to manipulate energy of many ways; for example, he was able to knockout "The Asgardian God Thor", draining his vital power. Also, Mister Miracle used his godlike powers to resurrect his wife and battle against Steppenwolf and Kalibak, temporarily stopping the war between New Genesis and Apokolips. Later, Scott relinquished his heritage.

Scott possesses greater power as the embodiment of the Anti-Life Equation. The ability is fueled by rage and negative emotions. The Anti-Life Equation can give any being the power to dominate the will of all sentient and sapient races and alter the reality, space, time, matter and anti-matter at the cosmic level. Mister Miracle proved to be powerful enough to fight Superman and Orion together.

The New 52
In The New 52 rebooted DC continuity, Mister Miracle retains the status of a New God and has been reborn more powerful than before. Mister Miracle is able to lift at least 50 tons. He is shown to have a high level of invulnerability; enduring space's rigors, surviving the explosion of three "Boom Spheres", resisting attacks of powerful beings such as Darkseid. His combined reflexes, speed and agility make him able to dodge almost any attack, even from two Apokalitian assassins, as he did with Lashina and Kanto. In addition, Mister Miracle has a limited healing factor and a great variety of mental tricks that allow him to break free of psychic influence. Mister Miracle is still a super escape artist and an expert combatant, successfully defeating Fury, Wonder Woman's daughter

Equipment
 Mother Box: The Mother Box can access the energy of the Source for various effects; it can change the gravitational constant of an area, transfer energy from one place to another, sense danger, sense of life, create force fields, transmute matter, absorb or project powerful shock blasts, create electro-webs of atoms, control the mental state of a being, communicate telepathically with a host or other life form, manipulate the life-force of a host to sustain it past fatal injuries, teletransportation, open and close Boom Tubes, and more.
 Costume: Mister Miracle's costume is magnetically sealed and provides limited protection from damage and fire. It contains numerous hidden pockets. Each glove and boot has a pocket and the slim utility belt contains half a dozen more. A secret pocket on the upper right arm hides his Mother Box. 
 Mask: Contains circuitry for his Mother Box and a life support unit. The circuits let Scott use his Mother Box hands free. The life support system lets him survive in hostile environments.
 Gloves: Have wide cuffs that hold Scott's multi-cube and assorted picks. In addition, the gloves can fire concussive blasts and generate enormous electric power, and contain a fingertip laser for fine welding or burning. His hidden circuits have the ability to create fission blasts and mini shockwaves.
 Boots: Contain laser-jets capable of burning almost any surface.
 Cape: Is made of a memory fibroid from New Genesis. Scott's Mother Box can transmute the cape into a cocoon that can withstand a sizable explosion. This can only be done once. The transmutation is not permanent and destroys the cape.
 Aero Discs: Thin metal plates about a foot across. The New Gods use them for personal travel. They can reach speeds of 250 mph. Scott has modified his discs considerably for battle. They can be attached to the forearms to use them as shields or blades.  
 Multi-Cube: A peripheral device for Mister Miracle's Mother Box. The cube was designed by Mister Miracle to use the transmutation power of the Mother Box to create a number of preset mechanisms in its interior. All of these functions are much easier to perform than improvised transmutation. They can be activated in stressful situations. The cube is small enough to be hidden in the palm of the hand. The multi-cube is not sentient but is still capable of interpreting complex commands and recording data. The multi-cube can fly under its own power and follow the mental commands of Mister Miracle. The cube can use the transmuting power of the Mother Box to create several hundred feet of swing line. Besides the cable, the cube can produce a smoke screen or fire suppression foam. The simplest use of the cube is to generate light effects. The cube can create lifelike holograms, a blinding flash or a laser capable of cutting through a steel cable or handcuff links. In hologram mode the cube can record extended scenes or make a complete holographic recording. It can then manipulate the playback to simulate the subject in motion. The cube can emit a powerful sonic beam that can spring locks or shatter a brick wall. The sound blast can stun an unprotected human.

Other versions

Kingdom Come
A future version of Mister Miracle and Big Barda along with their daughter, appeared in the mini-series Kingdom Come. Being an escape artist, Mister Miracle would assist Superman in creating the Gulag, an inescapable prison for meta-humans. He and Barda have a daughter, Avia, who uses a mega-rod and wears an outfit that combines elements of those of her parents. In the Elliot S! Maggin novelization, Free is teaching the lowlies art and constantly berates Orion to inspire (unsuccessfully) individual thought (though Scott likes Orion). Scott saves his wife and Avia near the conclusion by activating a boom tube just as the nuclear weapon explodes (Avia: "How did you know?" Barda: "He always knows").

Superman: The Dark Side
Mister Miracle appeared in the Elseworlds book Superman: The Dark Side, in which he becomes Metron's successor.

JLA: The Nail
In the Elseworlds series JLA: The Nail, Mister Miracle and Barda are shown being captured on Apokolips as they were on an undercover mission to rescue friends from Granny Goodness' orphanage, which, coupled with a mysterious force field that has just appeared around Earth, prompts Darkseid to conclude that New Genesis intend to escalate their conflict into open war. In the sequel, JLA: Another Nail, while being tortured by Desaad, Scott achieves the ultimate escape by downloading his consciousness into Barda's Mother Box, just before he is tortured to death, reasoning that he has escaped the trap of his body. The Mother Box circuitry is later bonded with a Green Lantern ring, allowing Miracle to project his consciousness into an energy construct, similar to his original body, although he will 'default' to essentially living in Barda's armour if the ring's charge becomes too weak.

The Sandman
In The Sandman #5, Scott Free dreams of his imprisonment on and attempted escape from Apokolips. Meanwhile, Dream is following a lead that takes him to the JLI embassy in the United States - when Scott wakes, Dream is standing over him.  With the help of the Martian Manhunter, Scott Free aids Dream in his search for his lost ruby.

In other media

Television
 Mister Miracle makes minor appearances in series set in the DC Animated Universe (DCAU). After making non-speaking cameo appearances in the Superman: The Animated Series episode "Apokolips...Now! Part II", the Batman Beyond two-part episode "The Call", and the Justice League episode "Twilight", he makes a speaking appearance in the Justice League Unlimited episode "The Ties That Bind", voiced by Ioan Gruffudd as an adult and by Zack Shada as his younger self.
 Mister Miracle appears in Batman: The Brave and the Bold, voiced by Yuri Lowenthal.
 Mister Miracle appears in the Justice League Action episode "It'll Take a Miracle!", voiced by Roger Craig Smith.
 Mister Miracle makes a cameo appearance in the Harley Quinn episode "Inner (Para) Demons", voiced by Andy Daly.

Film
 An alternate universe incarnation of Mister Miracle makes a non-speaking appearance in a flashback in Justice League: Gods and Monsters.
 Director Ava DuVernay and comic writer Tom King were collaborating on a New Gods film, which would have featured Mister Miracle and Big Barda, but the project was cancelled in April 2021.

Video games
 Mister Miracle appears in DC Universe Online via the "Halls of Power" DLC trilogy.
 Mister Miracle appears as a playable character in Lego DC Super-Villains, voiced again by Roger Craig Smith.

Collected editions
 Jack Kirby's Mister Miracle: Super Escape Artist collects Mr Miracle #1–10, 256 pages, September 1998, 
 Jack Kirby's Fourth World: Featuring Mister Miracle collects Mr Miracle #11–18, 187 pages, July 2001, 
 Jack Kirby's Fourth World Omnibus
 Volume 1 collects Forever People #1–3, Mister Miracle #1–3, The New Gods #1–3, Superman's Pal Jimmy Olsen #133–139, 396 pages, May 2007,  (hardcover); December 2011,  (paperback) 
 Volume 2 collects Forever People #4–6, Mister Miracle #4–6, The New Gods #4–6, Superman's Pal Jimmy Olsen #141–145, 396 pages, August 2007,  (hardcover); April 2012,  (paperback)
 Volume 3 collects Forever People #7–10, Mister Miracle #7–9, The New Gods #7–10, Superman's Pal Jimmy Olsen #146–148, 396 pages, November 2007,  (hardcover); August 2012,  (paperback)
 Volume 4 collects Forever People #11; Mister Miracle #10–18; The New Gods #11; "Even Gods Must Die" from The New Gods vol. 2 #6; DC Graphic Novel #4: "The Hunger Dogs"; "On the Road to Armagetto!" (previously unpublished), 424 pages, March 2008,  (hardcover); December 2012,  (paperback)
 Mister Miracle by Steve Englehart and Steve Gerber collects Mister Miracle #19–25, 216 pages, March 2020,

Awards
The Mister Miracle series plus Forever People, New Gods, and Superman's Pal Jimmy Olsen earned Jack Kirby the 1971 Shazam Award for Special Achievement by an Individual in the comic industry.

The Mister Miracle series by Tom King and Mitch Gerads won the 2019 Eisner Award for Best Limited Series.

See also
 Jack Kirby bibliography

References

External links
 DCU Guide: Mister Miracle
 Mister Miracle at Mike's Amazing World of Comics
 Mister Miracle at the Superman Homepage

 

1971 comics debuts
Characters created by Jack Kirby
Comics by Doug Moench
Comics by J. M. DeMatteis
Comics by Keith Giffen
Comics by Len Wein
Comics by Steve Englehart
Comics by Steve Gerber
Comics by Tom King (writer)
Comics characters introduced in 1971
DC Comics American superheroes
DC Comics characters who can move at superhuman speeds 
DC Comics characters who can teleport
DC Comics characters with superhuman strength
DC Comics deities
DC Comics male superheroes
DC Comics titles
Fictional characters with superhuman durability or invulnerability
Fictional attempted suicides
Fictional circus performers
Fictional escapologists
New Gods of New Genesis
New Gods of Apokolips
New Hampshire in fiction
Superheroes who are adopted